Slapper may refer to:

Slapper detonator
Slapper, a metalworking hand tool
Slapper, a character in Transformers: Robots in Disguise
"Slapper" (Ayye), a 2012 single by Nadia Oh